Zbyszek Zaborowski (born 26 February 1958 in Wilamowice) is a Polish politician. He was elected to Sejm on 25 September 2005, getting 12643 votes in 31 Katowice district as a candidate from Democratic Left Alliance list.

He was also a member of Sejm 1993-1997, Sejm 1997-2001, and Sejm 2001-2005.

See also
Members of Polish Sejm 2005-2007

External links
Zbyszek Zaborowski - parliamentary page - includes declarations of interest, voting record, and transcripts of speeches.

1958 births
Living people
People from Wilamowice
Democratic Left Alliance politicians
Members of the Polish Sejm 1993–1997
Members of the Polish Sejm 1997–2001
Members of the Polish Sejm 2001–2005
Members of the Polish Sejm 2005–2007
Members of the Polish Sejm 2011–2015